The M4 (the Harbour Line) of the Copenhagen Metro connects Nordhavn in the north with Sydhavn in the south. The central part of the line shares tracks with the City Circle Line (M3).

The Nordhavn branch was approved by the Danish Parliament in 2012 and was opened on 28 March 2020.
The Sydhavn branch was approved in 2015 and is expected to open in 2024.

Both Nordhavn and Sydhavn are former industrial areas situated at opposite ends of the Port of Copenhagen and currently undergoing urban renewal under the auspices of By & Havn.

When the City Circle Line was planned, the M4 was intended to supplement the M3 from Nørrebro to København H providing increased metro capacity to the eastern section of the inner city. At this time, it was presumed that the M4 would eventually be expanded from Nørrebro to the northwestern suburbs, but this plan was abandoned in 2009, when the city of Copenhagen scrapped plans for an interchange facility under Nørrebro station. Instead, the city preferred a solution where the M4 would connect the Nordhavn and Sydhavn districts.

Stations and route

The M4 Line serves 8 stations. From København H to Østerport the line is shared with M3.

Stations
Nordhavn section (2020)
 Orientkaj
 Nordhavn (interchange with S-trains)

Stations shared with the M3 (2020)
 Østerport (interchange with S-trains and DSB)
 Marmorkirken (The Marble Church)
 Kongens Nytorv (interchange with all other metro lines)
 Gammel Strand near Christiansborg Palace
 Rådhuspladsen (City Hall Square)
 København H (Copenhagen Central Station, interchange with S-trains and DSB.)

Sydhavn section (2024)
 Havneholmen
 Enghave Brygge
 Sluseholmen
 Mozarts Plads
 København Syd (until 2024 named Ny Ellebjerg, interchange with S-trains and DSB)

In April 2017 it was announced that the five Sydhavn stations would feature artwork from five Danish artists: Superflex, Pernille With Madsen, René Schmidt, Christian Schmidt-Rasmussen, Henrik Plenge Jakobsen.

Possible future extensions

An extension in Nordhavn with 3 additional stations have been proposed, with the possibility of extending the line even further towards Hellerup Station.

Two possible extensions from Ny Ellebjerg Station in Sydhavnen are being looked into. One towards Hvidovre and one towards Bispebjerg. To enable such future extensions from the current M4 terminus, Ny Ellebjerg, it was decided in 2016 that the station would be built as an underground station instead of overground as previously decided.

References

 
Railway lines opened in 2020
2020 establishments in Denmark
Port of Copenhagen